J. Roy Hunt (July 7, 1884 Caperton, West Virginia  – October 1972 Sheffield, Alabama) born John Roy Hunt was an American motion picture cameraman and cinematographer. His career began around the time of World War I and continued to the 1950s. Hunt served as director of cinematography on numerous films, such as Beau Geste, A Kiss for Cinderella, Flying Down to Rio, and She.

Partial filmography

A Daughter of the Gods (1916)
 The Lincoln Cycle (1917)
The Lone Wolf (1917)
 Victory and Peace (1918)
Pagan Love (1920)
The Branded Woman (1920)
Woman's Place (1921)
 What Women Will Do (1921)
Love's Redemption (1921)
Polly of the Follies (1922)
Sherlock Holmes (1922)
Smilin' Through (1922)
Second Youth (1924)
The Rejected Woman (1924)
Dangerous Money (1924)
Argentine Love (1924)
 Her Own Free Will (1924)
The Crowded Hour (1925)
The Manicure Girl (1925)
Wild, Wild Susan (1925)
Lovers in Quarantine (1925)
A Kiss for Cinderella (1926)
The American Venus (1926)
Dancing Mothers (1926)
The Ace of Cads (1926)
She's a Sheik (1927)
Something Always Happens (1928)
The Fifty-Fifty Girl (1928)
Forgotten Faces (1928)
Take Me Home (1928)
Interference (1929)
The Virginian (1929)
The Cocoanuts (1929)
The Dance of Life (1929)
Why Bring That Up? (1929)
Dixiana (1930)
The Woman Between (1931)
Friends and Lovers (1931)
Consolation Marriage (1931)
Let's Try Again (1934)
The Last Days of Pompeii (1935)
Sea Devils (1937)
Thundering Hoofs (1942)
Crossfire (1947)
Gun Smugglers (1948)
Return of the Bad Men (1948)
Rustlers (1949)

Footnotes

References
Canham, Kingsley. 1976. The Hollywood Professionals, Volume 5: King Vidor, John Cromwell, Mervyn LeRoy. The Tanvity Press, London.

External links

1884 births
1972 deaths
American cinematographers
People from Fayette County, West Virginia